"Anthropology" (also known as "Thriving from a Riff" or "Thriving on a Riff") is a bebop-style jazz composition that is credited to Charlie Parker and Dizzy Gillespie. Parker stated in 1949 that Gillespie had played no part in its writing, and that others had added the trumpeter as co-composer.

It is a contrafact, being based on the harmony of "I Got Rhythm". The first recording of the composition, then known as "Thriving from a Riff", was made on November 26, 1945, by an ensemble led by Parker. The other musicians were trumpeter Miles Davis, pianist Argonne Thornton, bassist Curley Russell, and drummer Max Roach.

See also
 List of jazz contrafacts
 List of 1940s jazz standards
 Charlie Parker's Savoy and Dial Sessions

References

Compositions by Charlie Parker
Compositions by Dizzy Gillespie
1940s jazz standards
Bebop jazz standards
1945 compositions
Jazz compositions